On the death of Mohammed Adil Shah, Sultan of Bijapur on 4 November 1656, Ali Adil Shah II, a youth of eighteen, succeeded to the throne of Bijapur through the efforts of the Prime Minister Khan Muhammad and the Queen, Badi Sahiba, sister of Qutb Shah of Golkonda.

His accession signaled disasters to the Kingdom and his reign marked the decline of the Bijapur Kingdom.

Reign 
Shah Jahan, anxious to annex Bijapur to his empire, found a pretext in the legitimacy of Alis parents. On Aurangzeb’s plea, Shah Jahan sanctioned the invasion of Bijapur and gave him a free hand to deal with the situation. This sanction of such a war was wholly unrighteous. Bijapur was not a vassal state of the Mughals; but an independent and equal ally of the Mughal Emperor, and the latter had no lawful right to confirm or question the succession to the Bijapur Sultanate. However, Aurangzeb, had to raise the siege and rush to the north for the war of succession to the Mughal throne.

With Muhammad’s death and Ali’s accession disorder had begun in the Karnataka. The Nayaks tried to recover their former lands. (Bangalore the capital of Karnataka was Bijapur’s administrative headquarters for controlling these feudatories by Kempegouda). On the other hand, Shivaji increased the momentum of acquiring more and more Bijapur territory and carved an independent Maratha state, while his diplomacy prevented any Mughal-Bijapur coalition against him.

At the court things were even worse. With the coming of a young and weak ruler, the party factions and struggle for supremacy was at its zenith. To aggravate the, Aurangzeb intrigued with Bijapur nobles and succeeded in winning over most of them.

Throughout his reign of 16 years, Ali struggled desperately both against the Mughals and the Marathas. He thrice repulsed Mughal invasions. But when he died in 1672 the Bijapur kingdom was deprived of most of its important territorial possessions. With the expansion of Shivaji’s kingdom there was a corresponding shrinkage in the Bijapur territory.

Death

Ali’s reign is marked by developments in Persian and Deccani literature and fine arts, and some good works of history were also produced under his patronage. He was buried in Ali Ka Rouza the world-famous Bara Kaman in Bijapur.

References

 Dehlavi, Basheeruddin: Wāqīyāt-i mamlakat-i Bījāpūr, Bangalore (Karnatak Urdu Academy) 2003.
 Firishta, Muḥammad Qāsim Hindū-Shāh Astarābādī: History of the Rise of the Mahomedan Power in India, till the Year 1612, translated by John Briggs, Calcutta (Editions Indian) 1829, rep. 1966.
 Nayeem, Muhammad: External Relations of the Bijapur Kingdom, Hyderabad A.P. (Bright Publishers) 1974.
 Verma, Dinesh Chandra: Social, economic, and cultural history of Bijapur, Delhi (Idarah-i Adabiyat-i Delli) 1990.

1672 deaths
17th-century Indian Muslims
17th-century Indian monarchs
Sultans of Bijapur
Adil Shahi dynasty
1656 in India
1672 in India
Year of birth unknown